Gaz Saleh-e Sofla (also Romanized as Gaz Şāleḩ-e Soflá; also known as Gesāleh-ye Pā’īn and Jezsāleh-ye Soflá) is a village in Hoseynabad Rural District, Esmaili District, Anbarabad County, Kerman Province, Iran. At the 2006 census, its population was 382, in 75 families.

References 

Populated places in Anbarabad County